Kulli is a village in Raasiku Parish, Harju County in northern Estonia.

Kulli has a station on the Elron eastern route.

References

Villages in Harju County